The 2005 Sam Houston State Bearkats football team represented Sam Houston State University as a member of the Southland Conference during the 2005 NCAA Division I-AA football season. Led by first-year head coach Todd Whitten, the Bearkats compiled an overall record of 3–7 with a mark of 2–4 in conference play, and finished tied for fifth in the Southland.

Schedule

References

Sam Houston
Sam Houston Bearkats football seasons
Sam Houston State Bearkats football